Kas, Kaš, or KAS may refer to:

People
Kaş (surname), a Turkish surname
Martien Kas (born 1966), Dutch neuroscientist

Fictional characters
 Kas the Bloody-Handed, in the Greyhawk setting

Places
 Kås, a town in Denmark
 Kaş, a town in Antalya province of Turkey
 Kingdom Of Arya Syimi, a kingdom in Central Europe and Southeast Asia 
 Gash, Hormozgan, also known as Kās, a town in Iran
 Qass, Azerbaijan, also known as Kas, a village on Azerbaijan

Schools
 Kaohsiung American School in Taiwan
 Karachi American School in Pakistan

Organizations
 Kas (cycling team), Spain, sponsored by the soft drink
 Karnataka Administrative Service
 Kerala Administrative Service
 Konrad Adenauer Stiftung, a German political foundation
 Korean Astronomical Society

Other uses
 Kas (drink), a brand of soft drink produced by PepsiCo
 Beta-ketoacyl-ACP synthase, a group of enzymes
 Kas is a Dutch style of closet for storing clothes

See also

Kaskas (disambiguation)
Kass (disambiguation)
Kaas (disambiguation)
Kash (disambiguation)